Clement Lindsay William Randall (8 August 1913 – 23 December 2007) was a New Zealand cricketer. He played in ten first-class matches for Wellington from 1948 to 1951.

See also
 List of Wellington representative cricketers

References

External links
 

1913 births
2007 deaths
New Zealand cricketers
Wellington cricketers
Cricketers from Napier, New Zealand